Campbell Village is a neighborhood of Oakland, California in Alameda County, California. It lies at an elevation of 16 feet (5 m). Campbell Village is the site of the Campbell Village Court housing projects.

References

Neighborhoods in Oakland, California